Geyali may refer to:
Göyəlli, Azerbaijan
Gəyəli, Azerbaijan
Geyali, Zangilan, Azerbaijan